Thomas Enraght O'Brien (4 May 1827 – 18 January 1896) was Lord Lieutenant of Limerick and Custos Rotulorum of Limerick between 29 November 1894 until his death. He left an estate worth over £30,000. He was married to Harriet O'Brien (née O'Neill). He is buried in Mount Saint Lawrence Cemetery, Limerick.

References

Irish lords
People from County Limerick